The 1976 Anapa mid-air collision was the collision of Aeroflot Flight 7957 (an Antonov An-24RV) and Aeroflot Flight S-31 (a Yakovlev Yak-40) on 9 September 1976, off the coast of Anapa in the Soviet Union. All 70 people on the two aircraft were killed in the crash. The primary cause of the accident was determined to be error by the air traffic controller; investigators never recovered the fuselage of the Yak-40.

Aircraft involved

Antonov An-24RV 
Aeroflot Flight 7957 was an Antonov An-24 registered as CCCP-46518 with 47 passengers and 5 crew members aboard. The aircraft was constructed in Kiev and first flew in 1973.  At the time of the accident, the aircraft had sustained a total of 6,107 flight hours and 4,626 pressurization cycles.

Crew 
Of the five crew members aboard, the cockpit crew consisted of:
 Captain Mikhail Gutanov (Михаил Михайлович Гутанов)
 Co-pilot Anatoly Buryi (Анатолий Антонович Бурый)
 Flight engineer Vladimir Pimenov (Владимир Александрович Пименов)
 Navigator Sergey Artemyev (Сергей Леонидович Артемьев)

Yakolev Yak-40 
Aeroflot Flight S-31 was a Yakovlev Yak-40 registered as CCCP-87772 with 14 passengers and 4 crew members aboard. The aircraft was constructed in 1970 at the Saratov Aviation Plant and transferred to Aeroflot shortly thereafter. At the time of the accident, the aircraft had sustained 6,842 flight hours and 7,174 pressurization cycles.

Crew 
The cockpit crew of the Yak-40 consisted of:
Captain Anatoly Ledenev (Анатолий Семенович Леденев)
Co-pilot Vladimir Gapon (Владимир Яковлевич Гапон)
Flight engineer Kevork Sandulyan (Кеворк Каспарович Сандулян)

Crash details 
The Yakolev Yak-40 departed from Rostov-on-Don Airport at 12:47 Moscow time and proceeded on the route to Kerch. After receiving confirmation from the controller the Yak-40 continued the flight path and reported passing the Novodmitrievskaya non-directional beacon at 13:34 and remained at an altitude of 5,700 metres. After passing that point the flight was supposed to decrease altitude in accordance with the flight plan, but the controller was busy managing other flights so he let the flight continue on to the Gelenjik-Kerch part of the route at the 5,700-meter altitude. At 13:43 the Yak-40 reported passing Gelendzhik and stated its altitude to be 5,700 metres, to which the controller responded by granting it permission to proceed with the Anapa transverse but yet again forgot to instruct the aircraft to change altitude.

The Antonov An-24 departed from Donetsk Airport at 12:56 for the flight to Sochi. At 13:32 the crew reported entering the Western section of Krasnodar on the Primorsko-Akhtarsk traverse at an altitude of 5,700 metres – the same altitude as the Yak-40 in the same section of airspace. The controller responded by permitting the An-24 to proceed to Anapa and keep the current altitude, then gave permission for the aircraft to continue on to Dzhubga without changing altitude.

At 13:51:05 Moscow time, the An-24 and Yak-40 collided in the air at an altitude of 5,700 meters, severing the tail sections of both aircraft. Both aircraft broke apart in mid-air and the wreckage fell into the Black Sea. All 70 people in the two aircraft were killed in the accident. Most of the dead from the An-24 were recovered from the water but no bodies from the Yak-40 were found nor was the fuselage of the Yak-40 recovered.

Causes 
The cause of the accident was determined mostly from radio and ground communications. The primary cause of the accident was described as a violation of the rules for maintaining separation between aircraft by the air traffic controller. Secondary causes of the accident were failure of both crews to remain sufficiently alert and a lack of appropriate situational analysis leading up to the accident.

References 

1976 in the Soviet Union
Aviation accidents and incidents caused by air traffic controller error
Aviation accidents and incidents in 1976
Aviation accidents and incidents in the Soviet Union
Mid-air collisions
Mid-air collisions involving airliners
Accidents and incidents involving the Antonov An-24
Accidents and incidents involving the Yakovlev Yak-40
September 1976 events in Europe
History of Krasnodar Krai
Aeroflot